Encephalartos munchii is a perennial species of cycad in Africa. In English, the species goes by the common name Munch's cycad.

Description
The species is dioecious.

It is an arborescent cycad, with an erect stem, up to 1 m tall and 30 cm in diameter, sometimes with secondary stems originating from basal suckers. [2]
The leaves, pinnate, arranged in a crown at the apex of the stem, are 1–1.3 m long, supported by a 15-20 cm long petiole, and composed of numerous pairs of lanceolate, coriaceous green leaves, long 15–20 cm, with spiny margin and pungent apex.
It is a dioecious species, with male specimens presenting from 1 to 6 sub-cylindrical, erect, 40–65 cm long and 7–9 cm broad, jade green, and female specimens with cylindrical-ovoid cones, generally solitary, 30–50 cm long and 16–20 cm broad, from glaucous green to jade green.
The seeds are roughly ovoid, 2.5-3.5 cm long, covered with a scarlet red sarcotesta.

References

External links

munchii